Clarence Driscoll (4 September 1895 – 1 May 1948) was an Australian cricketer. He played one first-class match for Tasmania in 1927/28.

See also
 List of Tasmanian representative cricketers

References

External links
 

1895 births
1948 deaths
Australian cricketers
Tasmania cricketers
Cricketers from Tasmania